Daniel Thornhill Moriarty (born 12 February 1999) is an English-South African cricketer. He represented the South Africa U19 team in 2016. He made his first-class debut on 1 August 2020, for Surrey in the 2020 Bob Willis Trophy. On debut, he took his maiden five-wicket haul in first-class cricket, with 5/64 in the second innings. He made his Twenty20 debut on 28 August 2020, for Surrey in the 2020 T20 Blast. He made his List A debut on 22 July 2021, for Surrey in the 2021 Royal London One-Day Cup.

In April 2022, he was bought by the Southern Brave for the 2022 season of The Hundred.

References

External links
 

1999 births
Living people
English cricketers
South African cricketers
Surrey cricketers
People from Reigate
Southern Brave cricketers